The SNCI Tower is a planned apartment skyscraper in Tribeca, Manhattan, New York City, New York. The building is planned to rise 289.6 meters (950 ft) with 57 floors. The building was proposed in mid-2011. The SNCI Tower was designed by the solus4 architectural firm and LeMessurier Consultants.

Design 
Solus4 designed the tower in accordance with what they dub their 'Sustainable Neighborhood Collaborative Initiative'. The tower features a double walled cladding system that uses a chimney effect to power turbines in the gap between the facades.  The tower is supported by a stiff concrete spine that reduces the need for columns at the perimeter, opening up views. Each floor is a separate  apartment. The base will have parking for a fleet of communally owned electric cars.

See also 
List of tallest buildings in New York City

References

External links 

Proposed buildings and structures in New York City